Bernard Graham (27 October 1922 – 14 June 1992) was a New Zealand cricketer. He played first-class cricket for Auckland and Northern Districts between 1953 and 1957.

Graham opened the batting with James Everest for Northern Districts in 1956–57, their inaugural first-class season. He made his highest score of 56 against Otago that season. He also played Hawke Cup cricket for Poverty Bay from 1950 to 1961.

See also
 List of Auckland representative cricketers

References

External links
 

1922 births
1992 deaths
New Zealand cricketers
Auckland cricketers
Northern Districts cricketers
Cricketers from Gisborne, New Zealand